Aise Johan de Jong (born 30 January 1966) is a Dutch mathematician born in Belgium. He currently is a professor of mathematics at Columbia University. His research interests include arithmetic geometry and algebraic geometry.

Education
De Jong attended high school in The Hague, obtained his master's degree at Leiden University and earned his doctorate at the Radboud University Nijmegen in 1992, under supervision of Frans Oort and Joseph H. M. Steenbrink.

Career
In 1996, de Jong developed his theory of alterations which was used by Fedor Bogomolov and Tony Pantev (1996) and Dan Abramovich and de Jong (1997) to prove resolution of singularities in characteristic 0 and to prove a weaker result for varieties of all dimensions in characteristic p which is strong enough to act as a substitute for resolution for many purposes.

In 2005, de Jong started the Stacks Project, "an open source textbook and reference work on algebraic stacks and the algebraic geometry needed to define them." The book that the project has generated currently runs to more than 7500 pages as of July 2022.

Awards and honors
In 1998 he was an Invited Speaker of the International Congress of Mathematicians in Berlin. He won the Cole Prize in 2000 for his theory of alterations. In the same year, De Jong became a correspondent of the Royal Netherlands Academy of Arts and Sciences. In 2022 he received the Leroy P. Steele Prize for Mathematical Exposition.

Personal life
De Jong lives in New York City with his wife, Cathy O'Neil, and their three sons.

Selected works

The Stacks Project

References

External links

Website at Columbia University
The Stacks Project

1966 births
Living people
20th-century Dutch mathematicians
21st-century Dutch mathematicians
Leiden University alumni
Radboud University Nijmegen alumni
De Jong, Aise Johan
Members of the Royal Netherlands Academy of Arts and Sciences
De Jong, Aise Johan
De Jong, Aise Johan
Arithmetic geometers